Virtus Investment Partners, Inc. operates a multi-manager asset management business, comprising a number of individual affiliated managers, each having its own investment process and brand, and the services of unaffiliated subadvisers.

History
Virtus Investment Partners, formerly known as Phoenix Investment Partners, Ltd., was formed on November 1, 1995, through a reverse merger with Duff & Phelps Investment Management Co., at the time the investment management affiliate of Duff & Phelps Corporation.

1995 - 2006
From 1995 to 2001, Virtus was a majority-owned indirect subsidiary of Phoenix Life Insurance Co. During this period, the company purchased a majority interest in several boutique investment management companies to establish its multi-manager business model. In addition to Duff & Phelps Investment Management, Virtus’ affiliates during this time included Kayne Anderson Rudnick Investment Management, LLC, Seneca Capital Management, and Zweig Advisers LLC, which was founded by legendary Wall Street investor Martin Zweig.

On January 11, 2001, a subsidiary of Phoenix acquired the outstanding shares of Phoenix Investment Partners not already owned, and the company became an indirect wholly owned subsidiary of Phoenix.

In May 2005, Phoenix Investment Partners acquired the remaining minority interest in Seneca Capital Management and in September of that year acquired the remaining minority interest in Kayne Anderson Rudnick, thereby increasing ownership of both companies to 100%. In May 2006, Phoenix Investment Partners adopted the Harris Insight Funds from Harris Investment Management, Inc.

2006 - 2009
In February 2008, Phoenix announced it would spin off Phoenix Investment Partners as an independent asset management company through a pro rata dividend of Phoenix Investment Partners' common stock to Phoenix's shareholders. On October 30, 2008, Harris Bankcorp Inc., a U.S. subsidiary of Bank of Montreal, announced it would acquire $45 million in convertible preferred stock, representing a 23 percent equity position in Virtus.

Virtus became an independent publicly traded company on December 31, 2008, upon completion of its spin-off from Phoenix. The first day of trading of VRTS was January 2, 2009, and company officials rang the opening bell at NASDAQ Market Site on January 5, 2009.

2010 - 2019 
The years 2011 through 2018 were a period of expansion for Virtus as it established or acquired several affiliated managers, beginning in June 2011, when it established Newfleet Asset Management as a fixed income affiliate with approximately $5.2 billion of assets under management. David L. Albrycht, formerly executive managing director of Goodwin Capital Advisors, an investment management company that previously was a subsidiary of Virtus, became chief investment officer of Newfleet. 

In October 2012, Virtus completed the acquisition of Rampart Investment Management, a registered investment adviser specializing in options strategies. In 2013, the company established a Dublin-based UCITS, and in 2015 acquired a majority interest in ETF Issuer Solutions (ETFis), a New York City-based company that operates a platform for listing, operating, and distributing exchange-traded funds. It was renamed Virtus ETF Solutions. 

In December 2016, Virtus agreed to acquire multi-boutique asset manager RidgeWorth Investments from private equity firm Lightyear Capital and Ridgeworth's employees for $472 million. That transaction, which was completed in June 2017, added approximately $40 billion in assets managed by Ridgeworth's three wholly owned affiliates, Ceredex Value Advisors, Seix Investment Advisors, and Silvant Capital Management. 

Virtus completed a majority investment in Sustainable Growth Advisers (SGA), an investment manager headquartered in Stamford, Connecticut that specializes in high-conviction U.S. and global growth equity portfolios, in July 2018.

Business Overview 

Retail products (available to individual investors) include open-end mutual funds, closed-end funds, exchange-traded funds, and retail separate accounts. The Virtus Mutual Funds family consists of 58 open-end mutual funds that are distributed primarily through intermediaries, including national and regional broker-dealers, independent broker-dealers, and independent financial advisory firms. Virtus' closed-end funds are managed by four affiliated managers. The closed-end funds trade on the New York Stock Exchange.

Retail separately managed accounts comprise intermediary programs, sponsored and distributed by unaffiliated brokerage firms, and private client accounts, which are offered to the high-net-worth clients of the affiliated managers.

Virtus also manages institutional accounts for corporations, multi-employer retirement funds, foundations, endowments, and special purpose funds.

Principal Subsidiaries

 Ceredex Value Advisors LLC uses bottom-up, company-by-company research, seeking to identify catalysts in undervalued, dividend-paying stocks when constructing value-oriented portfolios for individuals, institutions, endowments, and foundations. 

Duff & Phelps Investment Management Co. pursues specialized investment strategies by identifying attractive opportunities through active management and fundamental research, while striving to manage the associated risks. The company manages assets for open- and closed-end funds and institutional separate accounts by investing in global utilities, infrastructure, and REITs.
Kayne Anderson Rudnick Investment Management, LLC (KAR) invests in equity portfolios of companies that have strong, consistent growth with low business and financial risk. The firm was founded in 1984 by two successful entrepreneurs, Richard Kayne and John E. Anderson, for whom the University of California, Los Angeles, named its business management school. KAR offers a variety of actively managed equity and fixed-income strategies to individuals through open- and closed-end funds and retail separate accounts, primarily to high-net-worth individuals. Institutional clients include endowments, foundations, corporations, public funds, and pension plans.
Newfleet Asset Management, LLC provides comprehensive fixed income portfolio management, including multi-sector, enhanced core, and core strategies. Additionally, Newfleet offers dedicated sector strategies, such as bank loans and high yield, through open- and closed-end funds, institutional accounts, structured products, and high-net-worth/private client portfolios.
Seix Investment Advisors, LLC has focused exclusively on managing fixed income securities since 1992. The company emphasizes rigorous bottom-up credit analysis of individual issues, downside risk protection, and credit valuations to manage assets in open-end mutual funds, institutional accounts, structured products, and high-net-worth/private client managed accounts.
Silvant Capital Management, LLC specializes in managing growth equity portfolios for individual and institutional investors, including large corporations, not-for-profit organizations, public funds, endowments, and foundations. The company evaluates positive secular trends and disruptive products and services that can change the business landscape, identifying those companies best positioned to exceed investor expectations.
Sustainable Growth Advisers, LP (SGA) manages U.S., global, emerging markets, and international large-cap portfolios, for institutional and individual investors, using a team-oriented approach and a consistent investment philosophy based on fundamental research and investing in equities of sustainable growth companies.
Virtus ETF Solutions, LLC is a multi-manager sponsor of ETFs that utilizes actively managed and index-based investment capabilities across equity and fixed income asset classes.

Unaffiliated Subadvisers
Virtus supplements the investment capabilities of its affiliated managers with select unaffiliated subadvisers whose strategies are not available to retail mutual fund customers. These subadvisers include:

Vontobel Asset Management, Inc. of New York, a wholly owned subsidiary of Vontobel Holding AG of Switzerland that specializes in managing long-only global equity portfolios.

References

SEC Approves Spin-off of Virtus Investment Partners to Phoenix Shareholders, bnet, Dec. 9, 2008
 Separation of Virtus Investment Partners from Phoenix, Wikinvest
Virtus Investment Partners Opens NASDAQ Stock Market, Tradingmarkets.com, Jan. 5, 2009

Companies based in Hartford, Connecticut
American companies established in 1995
Investment companies of the United States
Companies listed on the Nasdaq
Financial services companies established in 1995